is a former Japanese football player. He last played for YSCC Yokohama.

Club statistics
Updated to 2 February 2018.

References

External links
Profile at YSCC Yokohama

1986 births
Living people
Toin University of Yokohama alumni
Association football people from Tokyo
Japanese footballers
J3 League players
Japan Football League players
YSCC Yokohama players
Association football defenders